Varsity Field may refer to:

Varsity Field (Albany, New York), the University at Albany college baseball stadium
Varsity Field (Binghamton, New York), the Binghamton University college baseball stadium

See also
Varsity Stadium, the University of Toronto college football stadium
Varsity Stadium (Vancouver), the University of British Columbia's defunct multi-sport stadium in Vancouver